Nicholas Hill may refer to:

Nicholas Hill (printer) (died c. 1553), native of the Low Countries who came to England in 1519
Nicholas Hill (Virginia Burgess) (1603–1675), politician and planter in the English colony of Virginia
Nicholas Hill, 9th Marquess of Downshire (born 1959), British peer, landowner, and accountant
Nicholas Hill (scientist) (1570–1610), English natural philosopher
Nick Hill (born 1985), American football player
Nick Hill (baseball) (born 1985), baseball pitcher
Nick Awde (Nick Awde Hill, born 1961), British writer, artist and singer-songwriter
Nic Hill (born 1981), American film director
Nicky Hill (born 1981), English footballer
Nicholas Hill (priest), Dean of St Patrick’s Cathedral, Dublin, 1428–1457